Evgeny Alexandrovich Chigishev (born May 28, 1979 in Novokuznetsk) is a former Russian weightlifter.

Career 
At the 2000 Summer Olympics he competed in the 105 kg category, ranking 5th.

He won overall silver at the 2005 World Championships, with a total of 457 kg, and at the 2007 World Championships, with a total of 441 kg.

He also won overall silver at the 2005 and 2007 European Championships, and bronze at the 2008 European Championships.

Chigishev won the silver medal at the 2008 Summer Olympics, with a combined total of 460 kg (snatch - 210 kg, clean and jerk - 250 kg).

Career bests
 Snatch: 211 kg at 2005 World Weightlifting Championships.
 Clean and jerk: 251 kg at 2005 Russian Championship.
 Total: 460 kg (210+250) at 2008 Summer Olympics.

References

External links 
 
 
 

1979 births
Living people
Russian male weightlifters
Olympic weightlifters of Russia
Olympic medalists in weightlifting
Olympic silver medalists for Russia
Weightlifters at the 2000 Summer Olympics
Weightlifters at the 2008 Summer Olympics
Medalists at the 2008 Summer Olympics
World Weightlifting Championships medalists
European Weightlifting Championships medalists
People from Novokuznetsk
Sportspeople from Kemerovo Oblast
20th-century Russian people
21st-century Russian people